1941 Wild, provisional designation , is an eccentric Hildian asteroid from the outermost region of the asteroid belt, approximately 20 kilometers in diameter.

It was discovered on 6 October 1931, by German astronomer Karl Reinmuth at Heidelberg Observatory in southern Germany. The asteroid was named for Swiss astronomer Paul Wild.

Orbit and classification 

Wild is a member of the Hilda family, a large group of asteroids that are thought to have originated from the Kuiper belt. Located in the outermost part of the main-belt, they orbit in a 3:2 orbital resonance with the gas giant Jupiter, meaning that for every 2 orbits Jupiter completes around the Sun, a Hildian asteroid will complete 3 orbits. As the Hildas neither cross the path of any of the planets nor can they be pulled out of orbit by Jupiter's gravitational field due to their resonance, it is likely that the asteroid will remain in a stable orbit for thousands of years.

The asteroid orbits the Sun in the outer main-belt at a distance of 2.8–5.1 AU once every 7 years and 10 months (2,870 days). Its orbit has an eccentricity of 0.29 and an inclination of 4° with respect to the ecliptic.

Physical characteristics 

According to the survey on the Hilda Population carried out by the Wide-field Infrared Survey Explorer (WISE) with its subsequent NEOWISE mission, Wild measures 17.2 kilometers in diameter, and its surface has an albedo of 0.152, while the Collaborative Asteroid Lightcurve Link assumes a standard albedo for carbonaceous asteroids 0.057, and calculates a diameter of 24.3 kilometers with an absolute magnitude of 11.8. WISE also classifies the carbonaceous asteroid as a metallic M-type.

A rotational lightcurve of Wild was obtained by Richard P. Binzel in October 1987. It gave a rotation period of 9.05 hours with a brightness variation of 0.36 magnitude. A longer period of 45.6 hours was derived from photometric observations at the Palomar Transient Factory in September 2011

Naming 

This minor planet was named in honor of Swiss astronomer Paul Wild (1925–2014), who worked at the Astronomical Institute of the University of Bern. Wild's research focused on the discovery and observation of supernovae in other galaxies. He was also a prolific discoverer of minor planets and comets, most notably of comet Wild 2, which he discovered at the university's nearby Zimmerwald Observatory, and which was later visited by NASA's Stardust Mission. The official  was published by the Minor Planet Center on 20 February 1976.

References

External links 
 Asteroid Lightcurve Database (LCDB), query form (info )
 Dictionary of Minor Planet Names, Google books
 Asteroids and comets rotation curves, CdR – Observatoire de Genève, Raoul Behrend
 Discovery Circumstances: Numbered Minor Planets (1)-(5000) – Minor Planet Center
 
 

001941
001941
Discoveries by Karl Wilhelm Reinmuth
Named minor planets
19311006